New York State Route 109 (NY 109), also known as the Babylon–Farmingdale Turnpike, is a four-lane state highway on Long Island in New York in the United States. It runs from Farmingdale in the Nassau County town of Oyster Bay to the village of Babylon in Suffolk County. It runs mainly west-to-east in a northwest to southeast direction.

Unusually, the mileage count on the reference markers on the highway begins at the route's eastern terminus at NY 27A in Babylon and increases as the route heads west and north toward Farmingdale. This runs contrary to the New York State Department of Transportation's standard practice of inventorying an east-west route from west to east.

Route description

NY 109 begins at a fork in the road from NY 24's western segment (Conklin Street) in the Nassau County village of Farmingdale. It proceeds eastward as Fulton Street in Farmingdale, a four-lane commercial arterial through the town, passing multiple apartment buildings. At Main Street, a median starts developing in the center, dividing NY 109 as it crosses through a residential section of Farmingdale. Soon crossing back into the town of Oyster Bay, the route parallels the Central Branch of the Long Island Rail Road as it heads through town. After crossing into another large commercial district, this time in the village of East Farmingdale in the town of Babylon, Suffolk County, NY 109 enters a partial cloverleaf interchange with NY 110 (Broad Hollow Road).

Now known as Farmingdale Road, the route passes a jughandle for Republic Airport. NY 109 crosses into an interchange with the Southern State Parkway and the Corporal Tony Casamento Highway. NY 109 changes names to Babylon–Farmingdale Road, passing south of Mount Ararat Cemetery. The four-lane arterial crosses through a large industrial section of Babylon, entering an intersection with County Route 3 (CR 3; North Wellwood Avenue). Changing over to a commercial neighborhood of Babylon, NY 109 remains four lanes, crossing an intersection with CR 2 (Straight Path). A short distance later, NY 109 enters an interchange with NY 27 (the Sunrise Highway) right where the boulevard form converts over to a limited access freeway. 

NY 109 continues east through Babylon, crossing between a commercial and residential neighborhood. Proceeding southeast, the route enters an intersection with Little East Neck Road North and CR 96 (Great East Neck Road). NY 109 changes names to Little East Neck Road North and turns southeast through Babylon. The four lane boulevard crosses into Argyle Park, crossing under the Long Island Rail Road Babylon Branch and into an intersection with CR 12 (South Railroad Avenue). NY 109 bends southward through Argyle Park, remaining four lanes into Deer Park, where it meets an intersection with NY 27A (West Main Street), the eastern terminus of NY 109.

History
NY 109 was assigned to its current alignment in the early 1930s and has not been altered since.

Major intersections

See also

References

External links

 NY 109 (Greater New York Roads)
 NY 109–110 Bridge (Arrt's Arrchives)

109
Transportation in Nassau County, New York
Transportation in Suffolk County, New York
Roads on Long Island